David Cal Figueroa (born 10 October 1982) is a Spanish sprint canoeist who has competed since 1999. Competing in three Summer Olympics, he has won five medals with a gold (C-1 1000 m: 2004 Summer Olympics) and four silvers (C-1 500 m: 2004, 2008; C-1 1000 m: 2008 and 2012; C-1 1000 m: 2012). With this latest medal in the London 2012 Olympic Games, he became the Spanish athlete with more Olympic medals of all time.

Cal was a junior world championship bronze medallist in Zagreb in 1999 (C-1 1000 m). The following year he became European C-1 500 m junior champion at Boulogne, France in 2000. He also won the C-1 1000 m bronze medal. He was a reserve at the Sydney Olympics. At the 2002 European under-23 championships in Zagreb, Croatia, Cal won the C-1 500 m bronze medal.

Cal has competed on the senior circuit since 2003, winning five medals at the ICF Canoe Sprint World Championships. This includes a gold (C-1 500 m: 2007), two silvers (C-1 1000 m: 2003, 2005, 2011), and a bronze (C-1 1000 m: 2007).

Cal was born in Cangas do Morrazo. He is 183 cm (6 ft 0 in) tall and weighs 91 kg (200 lbs).

Olympic results

See also
 List of Olympic medalists in canoeing (men)

References

External links
 London 2012 profile

1982 births
Canoeists at the 2004 Summer Olympics
Canoeists at the 2008 Summer Olympics
Canoeists at the 2012 Summer Olympics
People from Cangas, Pontevedra
Sportspeople from the Province of Pontevedra
Living people
Olympic canoeists of Spain
Olympic gold medalists for Spain
Olympic silver medalists for Spain
Spanish male canoeists
Olympic medalists in canoeing
ICF Canoe Sprint World Championships medalists in Canadian
Medalists at the 2012 Summer Olympics
Medalists at the 2008 Summer Olympics
Medalists at the 2004 Summer Olympics
21st-century Spanish people